"Legend" (Russian: Легенда, Legenda), Op. 54, No. 5 (also known as "The Crown of Roses" in some English-language sources) is a composition by Pyotr Ilyich Tchaikovsky. Originally written in 1883 as a song for solo voice and piano, it was subsequently arranged by Tchaikovsky for solo voice and orchestra (1884), and then for unaccompanied choir (1889).

Words

The words are based on the poem "Roses and Thorns" by American poet Richard Henry Stoddard, originally published in Graham's Magazine of May 1856. Stoddard's poem was translated into Russian by the poet Aleksey Pleshcheyev and published in the Russian journal Sem'ia i shkola ("Family and School") in 1877. Pleshcheyev described the origin of the poem only as "translated from the English", without crediting Stoddard, the nature of whose contribution was thus lost. The poem was included in Pleshcheyev's anthology Snowdrop (Подснeжник; 1878), where it was found by Tchaikovsky.

When "Legend" is sung by English-speaking choirs, the words used are usually those of Geoffrey Dearmer, who translated Pleschcheyev's Russian text back into English for the English Carol Book (1913). Dearmer himself was only 20 years old when he wrote the words. While Pleshcheyev's Russian lyrics are a near-literal translation of Stoddard, and also copy the original rhyming scheme ABCB, Dearmer uses considerable poetic licence and a new rhyming scheme of AABB.

Music
The song is in the key of E minor, but the lack of any accidentals in the melody gives it a modal character. The original form of the song has a brief piano introduction and coda. This is retained in the orchestral arrangement. In the choral arrangement, the introduction is eliminated, and the piano coda is replaced by a choral coda featuring extremely low basses.

The melody of the original version is shown below:

The relative major (G major) is prominent in Tchaikovsky's harmonization, as the following fragment, (from the choral arrangement) illustrates:

Performance and publication history
The original version of the music, for solo voice and piano, was published as part of Tchaikovsky's Songs for Children, Op. 54, in 1884.

The orchestra arrangement was made for tenor Dmitri Usatov, who premiered it in April 1884 at the Bolshoi Theatre.

The choral arrangement was premiered by the Chorus of the Imperial Opera under the direction of Fyodor Becker in March 1889. Both the orchestral and choral arrangements were published in 1890.

The choral arrangement was subsequently performed under Tchaikovsky's direction at one of the official opening concerts of Carnegie Hall in May 1891. According to the New York Times review, it "made a great hit", with the composer being "called out twice after it with great enthusiasm". An English translation, "When Jesus Christ was yet a child", was made by Geoffrey Dearmer and published in The English Carol Book in 1913.

Legacy
The song was the basis of Anton Arensky's Variations on a Theme by Tchaikovsky, Op. 35a (1894), for string orchestra.

References

External links
 
 Score of the choral arrangement, with Tchaikovsky's markings
 "When Jesus Christ Was Yet a Child" (English translation)

Compositions by Pyotr Ilyich Tchaikovsky
1883 compositions
Compositions in E minor
Art songs
Choral compositions